The Central American dry forests ecoregion, of the  tropical and subtropical dry broadleaf forests biome, is located in Central America.

Geography
The ecoregion covers a total area of approximately 68,100 km2. It extends along the Pacific coast of Central America, from southern Chiapas in southeastern Mexico through Guatemala, El Salvador, Honduras, and Nicaragua to the northeast of Costa Rica. Pockets of dry forest are also found in inland valleys among the Central American mountains. The dry forests extend from sea level up to 800 meters elevation.

Climate
The climate of the ecoregion is tropical. Average annual rainfall is between 1000 and 2000 mm, and is highly seasonal. 5 to 8 months of the year are dry, generally with one longer and one shorter dry period per year.

The Central American mountains generally run from northwest to southeast, and Central America's prevailing winds generally blow from northeast or east to southwest or south. This weather and geologic pattern leaves much the Pacific slope of Central America, and some interior valleys, in the rain shadow of the mountains, and generally drier than the Caribbean side and the mountains.

Flora
The main natural plant community is low-stature dry forest. The forest structure consists of a canopy of trees up to 30 meters in height, and an understory of small trees, large shrubs, and woody lianas. Most canopy trees are deciduous, losing their leaves during the dry season. Many canopy tree species belong to the bean family (Fabaceae) of flowering plants, and have compound leaves. Common canopy trees in the southern portion of the ecoregion include Bombax ceiba, Bonellia macrocarpa subsp. pungens, Calycophyllum candidissimum, Casearia arguta, Chomelia spinosa, Croton reflexifolius, Enterolobium cyclocarpum, Eugenia salamensis, Erythroxylum havanense, Guazuma ulmifolia, Handroanthus ochraceus, Tabebuia rosea, Thouinidium decandrum, Trichilia americana, and Zanthoxylum setulosum.

The understory includes more evergreen trees and shrubs, often thorny, with members of the Rubiaceae family prominent.

At least 50 plant species are endemic to the ecoregion. Endemic genera include Myrospermum and Rehdera, which is endemic to northern Guanacaste Province of Costa Rica.

Fauna
Native mammals include jaguar (Felis onca), puma (Puma concolor), ocelot (Leopardus  pardalis), margay (Leopardus wiedii), jaguarundi (Herpailurus yagouaroundi), Baird's tapir (Tapirus bairdii), northern tamandua (Tamandua mexicana), and Central American spider monkey (Ateles geoffroyi).

Near-endemic and limited-range bird species native to the ecoregion include the white-bellied chachalaca (Ortalis leucogastra), blue-tailed hummingbird (Saucerottia cyanura), giant wren (Campylorhynchus chiapensis), and Pacific parakeet (Psittacara strenuus).

Conservation
Much of the ecoregion has been cleared and converted into pastures for cattle grazing, which is the main cause of its destruction. It is ranked critical/endangered by the World Wildlife Fund.

Protected areas
6.75% of the ecoregion is in protected areas. Protected areas include:
 Agalta National Park, Honduras
 Azul Meámbar National Park, Honduras
 Barra Honda National Park, Costa Rica
 Carara National Park, Costa Rica
 El Imposible National Park, El Salvador
 Guanacaste National Park, Costa Rica
 La Tigra National Park, Honduras
 Las Baulas de Guanacaste Marine National Park, Costa Rica
 Montaña de Botaderos Carlos Escaleras Mejía National Park, Honduras
 Montaña de Comayagua National Park, Honduras
 Palo Verde National Park, Costa Rica
 Pico Bonito National Park, Honduras
 Pico Píjol National Park, Honduras
 San Diego and San Felipe Las Barras National Park, El Salvador
 Santa Bárbara National Park, Honduras
 Santa Rosa National Park, Costa Rica
 Sipacate-Naranjo National Park, Guatemala

See also
 List of ecoregions in Mexico
 List of ecoregions in Guatemala

References

 
Neotropical dry broadleaf forests
Ecoregions of Central America
Natural history of Mesoamerica
Ecoregions of Costa Rica
Ecoregions of El Salvador
Ecoregions of Guatemala
Ecoregions of Honduras
Ecoregions of Mexico
Ecoregions of Nicaragua

Forests of Costa Rica
Forests of El Salvador
Forests of Mexico
Forests of Nicaragua